The United Nations Educational, Scientific and Cultural Organization (UNESCO) World Heritage Sites are places of importance to cultural or natural heritage as described in the UNESCO World Heritage Convention, established in 1972.  Cultural heritage consists of monuments (such as architectural works, monumental sculptures, or inscriptions), groups of buildings, and sites (including archaeological sites). Natural features (consisting of physical and biological formations), geological and physiographical formations (including habitats of threatened species of animals and plants), and natural sites which are important from the point of view of science, conservation or natural beauty, are defined as natural heritage. Albania ratified the Convention Concerning the Protection of the World Cultural and Natural Heritage on 10 July 1989, making its historical sites eligible for inclusion on the list.

, there are four sites in Albania inscribed on the list and further four sites on the tentative list. The first site in Albania to be added to the list was the ancient city of Butrint which was inscribed at the 16th UNESCO session in 1992. The historic centre of Gjirokastër was inscribed in 2005 as Museum-City of Gjirokastra. In 2008, the historic centre of Berat was added to the site, to form the Historic Centres of Berat and Gjirokastër. In 2017, the Gashi River and Rrajcë regions were listed as part of the Ancient and Primeval Beech Forests of the Carpathians and Other Regions of Europe that is shared with 17 other countries. In 2019, the site Natural and Cultural Heritage of the Ohrid region, a World Heritage Site in North Macedonia since 1979, was expanded to include the Albanian part of the coast.

World Heritage Sites 

UNESCO lists sites under ten criteria; each entry must meet at least one of the criteria. Criteria i through vi are cultural, and vii through x are natural.

Tentative list 

In addition to the sites inscribed on the World Heritage list, member states can maintain a list of tentative sites that they may consider for nomination. Nominations for the World Heritage list are only accepted if the site was previously listed on the tentative list. , Albania recorded four sites on its tentative list.

See also 
 UNESCO Memory of the World Programme Lists
 UNESCO Intangible Cultural Heritage Lists

References 

Albania history-related lists
 
Albania
Lists of buildings and structures in Albania
Albanian culture
World Heritage Sites